Black Africa Sports Club is a Namibian football team from Katutura, Windhoek that plays in the Namibia Premier League.

Achievements
Namibia Premier League: 10
 1987, 1989, 1995, 1998, 1999, 2011, 2012, 2013, 2014, 2019

NFA-Cup: 3
 1990, 1993, 2004

Performance in CAF competitions
CAF Champions League: 1 appearance
2014 – Preliminary Round

African Cup of Champions Clubs: 1 appearance
1996 – First Round

CAF Cup Winners' Cup: 2 appearances
1991 – Preliminary Round
1994 – withdrew in Preliminary Round

References

External links
 

1986 establishments in South West Africa
Association football clubs established in 1986
Football clubs in Namibia
Namibia Premier League clubs
Sport in Windhoek